Joe Bordeaux (March 9, 1886 – September 10, 1950) was an American film actor.  He appeared in more than 70 films between 1914 and 1940. He was born in Colorado, and died in Los Angeles, California.

Selected filmography

 Mabel at the Wheel (1914, Short) - Dubious Character
 The Knockout (1914, Short) - Policeman (uncredited)
 The Property Man (1914, Short) - Old Actor
 Mabel and Fatty's Wash Day (1915, Short) - Cop (uncredited)
 Mabel and Fatty's Married Life (1915, Short) - Farm Hand
 Mabel and Fatty's Simple Life (1915, Short) - Farm Hand
 Fatty and Mabel at the San Diego Exposition (1915, Short) - Flirty Guy in Go-Cart (uncredited)
 Mabel, Fatty and the Law (1915, Short) - Cop in Park (uncredited)
 Fatty's New Role (1915, Short) - Cop (uncredited)
 Fatty's Faithful Fido (1915, Short) - Man at the Dance (uncredited)
 When Love Took Wings (1915, Short) - Fatty's Rival - the Girl's True Love
 Wished on Mabel (1915, Short) - Thief
 Mabel's Wilful Way (1915, Short) - Cop (uncredited)
 Miss Fatty's Seaside Lovers (1915, Short) - Short Suitor
 Fatty's Plucky Pup (1915, Short) - Shell Game Accomplice
 Fatty's Tintype Tangle (1915, Short) - Passerby with Banana / Driver / Cop (uncredited)
 Fatty and Mabel Adrift (1916, Short) - Landem's Chauffeur / 2nd Robber (uncredited)
 Bright Lights (1916, Short) - Man Used as Battering Ram by Fatty (uncredited)
 His Wife's Mistakes (1916, Short) - The Waiter
 The Other Man (1916, Short) - Another Tramp (uncredited)
 The Moonshiners (1916, Short) - The Moonshiner
 The Waiters' Ball (1916, Short) - The Cashier's Brother
 The Butcher Boy (1917, Short) - Accomplice
 Coney Island (1917, Short) - Sledgehammer Man / Cop (uncredited)
 The Slave (1917, Short)
 A Reckless Romeo (1917, Short)
 His Day Out (1918, Short)
 The Rogue (1918, Short)
 The Orderly (1918, Short)
 The Scholar (1918, Short)
 The Messenger (1918, Short)
 The Handy Man (1918, Short)
 Moonshine (1918, Short)
 Good Night, Nurse! (1918, Short)
 Mickey (1918) - Stage Driver (uncredited)
 The White Sheep (1924)
 Old Clothes (1925)
 The First Auto (1927) - Livery Handler at Auction (uncredited)
 The Matinee Idol (1928) - Auditioning Actor (uncredited)
 Golf Widows (1928)
 Steamboat Bill, Jr. (1928) - Ship's Officer on the King who fights with Keaton (uncredited)
 Submarine (1928)
 The Power of the Press (1928) - Newspaper Employee (uncredited)
 The Sideshow (1928) - Roustabout (uncredited)
 The Younger Generation (1929) - Crook (uncredited)
 Spite Marriage (1929) - Rumrunner (uncredited)
 Flight (1929) - Marine (uncredited)
 Hurricane (1929) - Pete
 The Man Hunter (1930) - Dennis
 Dancing Sweeties (1930) - Dance Hall Customer (uncredited)
 The Doorway to Hell (1930) - Joe - a Gangster (uncredited)
 High Speed (1932) - Tony Orlando
 The Dentist (1932, Short) - Benford's Caddy (uncredited)
 Hypnotized (1932) - Seaman (uncredited)
 Frisco Jenny (1932) - Drunken Sailor (uncredited)
 Lady for a Day (1933) - Reception Guest (uncredited)
 Broadway Bill (1934) - (uncredited)
 Murder in the Clouds (1934) - Carson (uncredited)
 Miss Pacific Fleet (1935) - Kidnapper Piloting Speedboat (uncredited)
 Hell-Ship Morgan (1936) - Bartender (uncredited)
 Pride of the Marines (1936) - Marine (uncredited)
 Mr. Deeds Goes to Town (1936) - Minor Role (uncredited)
 Panic on the Air (1936) - Taxi Driver (uncredited)
 Our Relations (1936) - Grubby Wharf Tough (uncredited)
 A Dangerous Adventure (1937) - Workman (uncredited)
 You Can't Take It with You (1938) - Taxi Driver (uncredited)
 The Story of Vernon and Irene Castle (1939) - Minor Role (uncredited)
 The Grapes of Wrath (1940) - Migrant (uncredited)
 I Take This Woman (1940) - Man in Clinic (uncredited)
 Men Against the Sky (1940) - Mechanic (uncredited)
 The Great Dictator (1940) - Ghetto Extra (uncredited)

External links

1886 births
1950 deaths
American male film actors
American male silent film actors
Male actors from Colorado
20th-century American male actors
People from Pueblo, Colorado